Living inside Your Love is the second studio album by Earl Klugh released in 1976, by Blue Note Records, BN-LA667-G. George Butler was the executive producer.

Cover Versions
American jazz guitarist George Benson also covered his version of "Living Inside Your Love" from his album Livin' Inside Your Love in 1979.

Track listing
 "Captain Caribe" (Dave Grusin) – 5:20
 "I Heard It Through the Grapevine" (Barrett Strong, Norman Whitfield) – 7:28
 "Felicia" (Earl Klugh) – 5:25
 "Living inside Your Love" (Klugh, Grusin) – 5:40
 "Another Time, Another Place" (Grusin) – 6:41
 "The April Fools" (Burt Bacharach, Hal David) – 3:43
 "Kiko" (Klugh) – 2:46

Personnel

Musicians
 Earl Klugh – guitar, 12-string guitar, acoustic guitar
 Eddie Daniels – saxophone, flute (on 1,3)
 Dave Grusin – keyboards, piano, electric piano, synthesizer 
 Jeff Mironov – guitar (on 1,2)
 Eddie Gomez – bass (on 5)
 Will Lee – bass (on 1,2)
 Francisco Centeno – bass (on 3,4)
 Louis Johnson – bass (on 7)
 Steve Gadd – drums
 Harvey Mason Sr. – percussion (on 7)
 Ralph MacDonald – percussion (on 1,2,3,4)

Additional Musicians
 Ann Barak, Julien Barber, Ruth Buffington, Frederick Buldrini, Doris Carr, Norman Carr, Joseph Goodman, Jean Ingraham, Theodore Israel, Harold Kohon, Richard Locker, Guy Lumia, Charles McCracken, Noel Pointer, Tony Posk, Margaret Ross, Richard Stocker, Gerald Tarack – strings
 Patti Austin, Vivian Cherry, Lani Groves – backing vocals

Technical
 Larry Rosen – producer, engineer
 Dave Grusin – producer
 Frank Laico – engineer
 Phil Schier – engineer

Charts

References 

1976 albums
Earl Klugh albums
Blue Note Records albums
Albums produced by Dave Grusin
Albums recorded at CBS 30th Street Studio
Albums recorded at Electric Lady Studios